Scouting in Mauritius began in 1912 when 17 year old Samuel Blunt de Burgh Edwards formed the first patrol of Scouts in Mauritius and later became the first adult leader. He is regarded as the founder of Scouting in Mauritius. Independent Scout troops were formed across Mauritius. In 1913 The Boy Scouts Association of the United Kingdom formed its Mauritian Local Association (later its Mauritian Branch) and attempted to register the local troops. Separate associations for Catholic, Protestant, Muslim and Hindu Scouts developed, some with connections to organisations in other nations. In 1971 The Mauritius Scout Association was constituted.

The Scout and Guide movement in Mauritius is now mainly served by
 The Mauritius Girl Guides Association, member of the World Association of Girl Guides and Girl Scouts
 The Mauritius Scout Association, member of the World Organization of the Scout Movement

See also

Scouting in displaced persons camps